Rupnagar district is one of twenty-two districts in the state of Punjab, India. The city of Rupnagar is said to have been founded by a Raja called Rokeshar, who ruled during the 11th century and named it after his son Rup Sen. It is also the site of an ancient town of the Indus Valley civilization. The major cities in Rupnagar District are Morinda, Nangal and Anandpur Sahib. Morinda is also known as Baghwāla "[The City] of Gardens." Morinda is located on the Chandigarh-Ludhiana Highway. The Bhakra Dam in Nangal lies on the boundary with the neighboring state of Himachal Pradesh. Dadhi is one of the most important villages of the district, particularly because of Gurudwara Sri Hargobindsar Sahib.

Ropar
Ropar is a 21-meter-high ancient mound overlaying the Shiwalik (also spelled as Sivalik or Shivalik) deposition on the left bank of the river Sutlej where it merges into the plains. It has yielded a sequence of six cultural periods or phases with some breaks from the Harappan times to the present day. The excavations were carried out by Dr. Y.D. Sharma of Archaeological Survey of India. The migration of the Harappans to Ropar has been postulated through the lost Saraswati River to the Sutlej as both rivers once belonged to one system.

Period I 
At Ropar excavation, the lowest levels yielded the Harappan traits in Period 1, which falls in the proto-historic period. A major find was a steatite seal in the Indus script used for the authentication of trading goods, impression of the seal on a terracotta lump of burnt clay, chert blades, copper implements, terracotta beads, and bangles and typically standardized pottery of Indus Valley civilization. They flourished in all the Harappan cities and townships.

The dead were buried with head generally to the north and with funerary vessels as unearthed in cemetery R-37 at Harappa (Sind, Pakistan). What led the Harappans to desert the site is not known.

Period II
Period II belongs to Painted grey ware people who followed the Harappans. Typical pottery of this period consisted of fine grey ware painted black, terracotta bangles, semi-precious stones, glass, bone arrowheads, ivory kohl sticks, and copper implements. This period is identified as the period belonging to the Great War Epic - Mahabharata.

A new settlement sprang up here by about 600 BC - chronologically Period III at Rupar. Grey pottery of Period II still continued. This period belongs to circa 600 BC to 200 BC. It yielded the earlier coins (punch-marked and uninscribed cast coins), copper, and implements. An important find was an ivory seal inscribed in Mauryan Brahmi script (4th and 3rd century BC)

Minutely carved and polished stone discs with a figure and motif associated with the cult of the Mother goddess of fertility have also been unearthed in the excavations from Taxila (now in Pakistan), Patna in the state of Bihar and other Mauryan sites. Houses of mud and kiln burnt bricks were by no means rare. A 3.6-meter wide burnt brick wall traced to a length of about 75 m probably endorsed a tank that collected water through inlets. The upper levels have soak wells lined with terracotta rings of Shunga and Kushana periods.

Period III To V
From Period III to V there are fairly rich dwelling complexes with houses of stone and mud bricks. The full plans of the houses could not be exposed owing to the vertical nature of excavations carried out.

Period VI
In the next phase, Period VI revealed the evidence of the Shungas, Kushanas, and Guptas and their successors. Excavations also revealed successive building levels of various dynasties. In the upper levels, a hoard of copper coins of Kushan and Gupta rules were found. This includes a gold coin issued by Chandragupta-Kumerdevi of the Gupta dynasty, which is also known as the golden age in ancient Indian history.

A large number of terracotta figurines of Shunga, Kushana, and Gupta periods were also discovered. Amongst them were a Yakshi figure with cherubic expression and a beautiful seated figure of a lady playing on the lyre reminiscent of Samudragupta’s figure in a similar position on the famous gold coins of the Gupta dynasty. A set of three silver utensils for ritualistic purposes with Greek influence depicts the fine craftsmanship of the Gupta dynasty in its chased decoration.

The pottery of this period in the upper levels is for the most part redware and is frequently decorated with incised motifs. After a short break, there is evidence of a fresh occupation identified as Period V commencing around the early 6th century and continuing for three or four centuries. The coins of Toramana (circa AD 500) and Mihirakula (circa 510-40) have been recovered from these levels. The spacious brick building of the fifth period was constricted neatly and evidence showed a good measure of prosperity during this period.

Probably after desertion, a new town sprang up here around 13th century AD on the same site named Period VI and it continues to flourish to the present day.

An archaeological site museum has been set up to house some of the antiquities of Rupar along with the photographs displaying excavation material.

Location 

Rupnagar district, included in the Patiala Division of Punjab falls between north latitude 30°-32' and 31°-24' and east longitude 76°-18' and 76°-55'. Rupnagar (formerly known as Ropar) town, the district headquarters is 42 km from Chandigarh, the state capital. The district adjoins Shahid Bhagat Singh Nagar (formerly known as Nawanshahar), Mohali and Fatehgarh Sahib Districts of Punjab. The district comprises 4 Tehsils, Rupnagar, Anandpur Sahib, Chamkaur Sahib and Nangal and includes 617 villages and 7 towns namely Rupnagar, Chamkaur Sahib, Anandpur Sahib, Morinda, Kiratpur Sahib and Nangal, Bela. All the towns except Chamkaur sahib fall on the railway line. The Satluj river passes close (2 to 5 km) to the towns of Nangal, Rupnagar, Bela and Anandpur Sahib. ropar fall in puadhregion except it's nurpur bedi sub-tehsil which is geographically in doabaregion of Punjab

Towns and villages 

Rupnagar district, included in the Rupnagar Division of Punjab falls between north latitude 30°-32' and 31°-24' and east longitude 76°-18' and 76°-55'. Rupnagar (formerly known as Ropar) town, the district headquarters is 42 km from Chandigarh, the state capital. The district adjoins Nawanshahar, Mohali, and Fatehgarh Sahib Districts of Punjab. The district comprises four Tehsils, Rupnagar, Anandpur Sahib, Chamkaur Sahib and Nangal and includes 617 villages and 6 towns: Rupnagar, Chamkaur Sahib, Anandpur Sahib, Morinda, Kiratpur Sahib and Nangal. All the towns except Chamkaur Sahib have railway connections. The Satluj river passes close to the towns of Nangal, Rupnagar, and Anandpur Sahib. Shekhian Mohalla is a famous old central part of Ropar city in the hold of migrated Hindu and Sikh population. Before partition inhibited by Muslim Kakkay Sheikhs of Ropar (also known Kakkay Abbasi). Now, this is a great trade hub of Ropar city.

Ghanauli is also Another Famous village of Ropar: Because of Freedom fighter Harnam Singh Kavishar, this village comes to the top list in British Raj.

Climate 
The climate of Rupnagar District is characterized by its general dryness (except in the south-west monsoon season), hot summer, and bracingly cold winter. The year may be divided into four seasons. The period from about the middle of November to February is the cold season. This is followed by the summer season from March to about the end of June. The south-west monsoon season commences late in June and continues up to about the middle of September. The period from mid-September to the middle of November constitute the post-monsoon or transition season. The temperature ranges from a minimum of 4 °C in winter to 45 °C in summer. May and June are generally hottest months and December and January are the coldest months. The relative humidity is high, averaging about 70 percent during monsoon. The average annual rainfall in the district is 775.6 mm. About 78 percent of the annual rainfall is received during the period from June to September. The soils of the District vary in texture generally from loam to silty clay loam except along the Sutlej River and where some sandy patches may be found. Chamkaur Sahib and Kharar blocks have sodic soils. The soils of Anandpur Sahib and Rupnagar blocks are undulating.

Politics

Tehsils in Rupnagar district
 Anandpur Sahib
 Chamkaur Sahib
 Nangal
 Rupnagar
 Morinda

Cities and towns 
 Anandpur Sahib
 Chamkaur Sahib
 Kiratpur Sahib
 Morinda
 Nangal
 Rupnagar
 Kamalpur
 Ghanauli
 Dadhi
Nurpur bedi
 Bharatgarh
 Kartarpur
 Bara, Punjab - A Famous Archelogical Site Village In Rupnagar District

Demographics

According to the 2011 census Rupnagar district has a population of 2,875,627, roughly equal to the nation of Equatorial Guinea . This gives it a ranking of 507th in India (out of a total of 640). Its population growth rate over the decade 2001-2011 was 8.67%. Rupnagar has a sex ratio of 913 females for every 1000 males, and a literacy rate of 83.3%. Scheduled Castes made up 26.42% of the population.
About 1,994,876 or 64.74%  were Sikhs. The Hindus were 676,765 or 33.47% of the population.

Notable people
 Kanshi Ram founder of Bahujan Samaj Party

References

External links 

 
 Govt. Website on Rupnagar
 Rupnagar BSNL telephone directory search
 Archaeological Museum in Rupnagar (Archaeological Survey of India)

 
Districts of Punjab, India